Flour beetles are members of the darkling beetle genera Tribolium or Tenebrio. They are pests of cereal silos and are widely used as laboratory animals, as they are easy to keep. The flour beetles consume wheat and other grains, are adapted to survive in very dry environments, and can withstand even higher amounts of radiation than cockroaches. They are a major pest in the agricultural industry and are highly resistant to insecticides.

The larvae of T. molitor, when full-grown, are known as mealworms; small specimens and the larvae of the other species are called mini mealworms.

Flour beetles are part of the life cycle of the tapeworm Hymenolepis nana, which causes hymenolepiasis in humans. Female reproduction is distributed over their adult life-span which lasts about a year. Flour beetles also display pre-mating discrimination among potential mates. Female flour beetles, specifically of T. castaneum, can mate with different males and may choose more attractive males over the course of their adult life-span.

Selected species 
 Aphanotus brevicornis – North American flour beetle
 Tribolium castaneum – red flour beetle
 Tribolium confusum – confused flour beetle
 Tribolium destructor – destructive flour beetle
 Tenebrio molitor – yellow mealworm beetle
 Tenebrio obscurus – dark mealworm beetle

Research 
In 2008, the Tribolium castaneum genome was sequenced by the Tribolium Genome Sequencing Consortium.

See also 
 Grain beetle (disambiguation)

References

External links 

Tenebrionidae
Storage pests
Insect common names